The Scottish Premier Hockey League is an ice hockey league in Scotland. The league began play in September 2007 and consists of five teams. It replaced the Scottish National League as the highest level of competition in Scotland behind the Elite League. In addition to the Premier League, membered teams will also take part in the Northern League with teams from the Northern section of the English National Ice Hockey League.

Teams

Dundee Stars*
Edinburgh Capitals*
Fife Flyers*
Paisley Pirates
Solway Sharks
Kilmarnock Storm
North Ayr
Inverness Capitals
 Dundee, Edinburgh and Fife now compete in the Elite League

References

Dundee Stars

1
2
Second tier ice hockey leagues in Europe